Samir Nabi (born 16 December 1996) is a professional footballer who plays as a midfielder for Sutton Coldfield Town on a dual-registration loan from Hednesford Town. Born in England, he represents Pakistan internationally.

Formed at West Bromwich Albion, he left in 2016 for Delhi Dynamos of the Indian Super League but did not make any appearances for either. He played three games for Carlisle United (one in EFL League Two) and then spent subsequent years in the English non-league. He earned two senior caps for Pakistan in June 2019.

Club career

West Bromwich Albion and Delhi Dynamos
An attacking central midfielder, Nabi was the top scorer for West Bromwich Albion's under-21 side in the 2015–16 season, scoring 6 goals in 18 appearances. In September 2016 he joined Indian Super League club Delhi Dynamos after an 11-year stint at various junior sides of the Hawthorns; his elder brother Adil made the same move a year earlier. He learned from teammate and former France international Florent Malouda during his time in the Indian capital.

Carlisle United
Having played no part in Delhi's season, Nabi returned to England on 24 March 2017, signing with Carlisle United for the rest of the EFL League Two season. His move was delayed due to international clearance requirements. He made his professional debut in his only league appearance for the Cumbrians, a 15-minute substitute appearance in place of John O'Sullivan on 1 April in a 2–0 win at Yeovil Town. Manager Keith Curle rewarded him with a new one-year contract, while saying that despite Nabi's technical ability he had to improve his game when Carlisle were without the ball. The following season, after only two EFL Trophy appearances to add to his account, he was one of eight players released by Carlisle, who missed out on the play-offs.

Torquay United
On 30 June 2018, he signed for National League South side Torquay United. He made his debut for the Gulls on 7 August as a half-time substitute for Chris Regis in a 1–0 home win over Bath City. On 30 October, as a late substitute, he was sent off for handball in a 2–2 draw at Weston-Super-Mare. Having struggled for playing time, on 22 February 2019 he was loaned to Halesowen Town of the Southern Football League for the rest of the season and appeared in 7 league matches.

Later career
On 16 January 2020 Nabi joined Kidderminster Harriers in the National League North on a deal until the end of the National League North season. He knew their interim manager Jimmy Shan from the West Brom academy. He joined Hereford of the same league on 3 October that year on a non-contract basis, then Worcester City of the Midland Football League Premier Division on a dual-registration basis on 3 December, before being released by Hereford on 2 June 2021.

Nabi joined Hednesford Town in the Southern Football League Premier Division Central on 30 September 2022. He made his debut, as a second-half substitute, the following day as his new side beat AFC Rushden & Diamonds 5–0. On 17 October, he signed for Sutton Coldfield Town on a dual-registation loan deal in order to gain match fitness in the Northern Premier League Division One Midlands.

International career
In May 2019, Nabi and younger brother Rahis were called up for Pakistan's 2022 FIFA World Cup qualifiers against Cambodia the following month. He made his debut on 6 June in the first leg, as a starter in a 2–0 loss. Five days later, he played the last two minutes as a substitute in a 2–1 loss in the second leg in Doha, Qatar.

Personal life 
Samir Nabi is the middle child of three British Pakistani brothers who came through the West Bromwich Albion academy, with elder brother Adil and younger brother Rahis.

Career statistics

Honours

Club
Torquay United
National League South: 2018–19

References

External links

1996 births
Living people
English footballers
Pakistani footballers
Pakistan international footballers
British sportspeople of Pakistani descent
British Asian footballers
Footballers from Birmingham, West Midlands
English people of Pakistani descent
Association football midfielders
Carlisle United F.C. players
Torquay United F.C. players
Halesowen Town F.C. players
Kidderminster Harriers F.C. players
Hereford F.C. players
Hednesford Town F.C. players
Sutton Coldfield Town F.C. players
English Football League players
National League (English football) players
Southern Football League players
Northern Premier League players
Midland Football League players